American singer-songwriter Meghan Trainor (born 1993) has released five studio albums, two extended plays (EP), two live albums, 29 singles (including six as a featured artist), 28 music videos, three independent albums, and 18 promotional singles. She self-released the albums Meghan Trainor (2009), I'll Sing with You (2011), and Only 17 (2011); they were pulled from circulation after she signed with Epic Records in February 2014. Trainor's debut single, "All About That Bass", was released on June 30, 2014, and topped the Billboard Hot 100 for eight consecutive weeks. The single became the longest-reigning number-one by an Epic recording artist in the United States, surpassing the seven-week record held by Michael Jackson's songs "Billie Jean" (1983) and "Black or White" (1991). It topped the national charts of 58 countries and became one of the best-selling singles of all-time. As of 2015, it had sold over 11 million units internationally. "All About That Bass" was certified diamond by the Recording Industry Association of America (RIAA), and preceded Trainor's debut EP, Title (2014), which peaked at number 15 on the Billboard 200 in September 2014.

On October 21, 2014, she released her second single "Lips Are Movin" which attained a peak of number four on the US Billboard Hot 100. It was further certified quadruple  platinum by the RIAA. The song preceded Trainor's debut major-label studio album Title (2015), which replaced her EP of the same name on the iTunes Store. Upon release, the album debuted atop the Billboard 200. To support the album, two more singles were released: "Dear Future Husband" and "Like I'm Gonna Lose You", the latter featuring American singer John Legend. Both peaked in the top 15 on the Billboard Hot 100 and were certified multi-platinum in the United States. The latter also reached number one in Australia and New Zealand.

On March 4, 2016, Trainor released "No" as the lead single from her second major-label studio album, Thank You. The song charted at number three on the Billboard Hot 100, earning a double platinum certification from the RIAA. "Me Too", released as the second single from the album on May 5, 2016, peaked at number 13 on the Billboard Hot 100, and was certified triple platinum by the RIAA. Thank You, released on May 6, 2016, debuted at number three on the Billboard 200, and was certified platinum by the RIAA. "Better" was released as the third single from the album. The lead single from Trainor's third major-label studio album, Treat Myself, called "No Excuses" was released on March 1, 2018, and charted at number 46 on the Billboard Hot 100, being certified platinum by the RIAA. "Let You Be Right" and "Can't Dance" were originally released as the second and third singles from the album respectively, but did not make the final cut. On February 11, 2019, "All the Ways" was serviced to hot adult contemporary radio as the lead single from Trainor's second EP, The Love Train, which was released on February 8, 2019. Treat Myself, released on January 31, 2020, debuted at number 25 on the Billboard 200. It was further promoted with its second and third singles, "Wave" and "Nice to Meet Ya", the latter of which reached number 89 on the Billboard Hot 100. Trainor's fourth major-label studio album, and debut Christmas album, A Very Trainor Christmas, was released on October 30, 2020. Trainor released her fifth major-label studio album, Takin' It Back, on October 21, 2022.

Albums

Studio albums

Independent albums

Live releases

Extended plays

Singles

As lead artist

As featured artist

Promotional singles

Other charted songs

Other appearances

Music videos

Notes

References

External links
 
 
 
 

Discographies of American artists
Discography
Pop music discographies